This is a list of episodes from the eighteenth season of Real Time with Bill Maher.

Episodes

References

External links
 HBO.com Episode List
 HBO.com Real Time with Bill Maher Free (audio-only) episodes and Overtime podcast
 TV.com Episode Guide
 

Real Time with Bill Maher seasons
2020 American television seasons
Television series impacted by the COVID-19 pandemic